Euphorbia santapaui is a species of plant in the family Euphorbiaceae. It is endemic to Tamil Nadu in India. It is threatened by habitat loss.

References

santapaui
Flora of Tamil Nadu
Endangered plants
Taxonomy articles created by Polbot